Robert Lostutter (born 1939) is a Chicago-based artist.  He was a member of the Chicago Imagists, a breakaway group of surrealist iconoclasts from the School of the Art Institute of Chicago who showed in the Hyde Park Art Center in 1969 and later.

His meticulous watercolors depict human-bird hybrids.

Publications
In 1964 Lostutter illustrated "The Things That Are", a book of poems for children by Adrien Stoutenburg, published by the Reilly & Lee Company of Chicago.

Collections
Robert Lostutter's art is in the collections of:

 Art Institute of Chicago
 Brooklyn Museum
 Illinois State University, Normal, Illinois
 Kansas City Art Institute
 Madison Museum of Contemporary Art
 Milwaukee Art Museum
 Museum of Contemporary Art, Chicago, Illinois
 Smithsonian Institution
 Nelson-Atkins Museum of Art
 Smart Museum, University of Chicago, Illinois

References
 James Yood writes about Robert Lostutter in Artforum, January 1993

School of the Art Institute of Chicago alumni
1939 births
Living people
20th-century American painters
American male painters
21st-century American painters
21st-century American male artists
20th-century American male artists